Jones Brothers Mule Barn, also known as Cassingham & Son Hardware Store, is a historic mule barn located at Warrensburg, Johnson County, Missouri. It was built in 1912, and consists of a two-story main block with a monitor roof and one-story rear ell.  It is constructed of red brick and sits on a stone foundation.  It was built as mule sales barn, and later served as a hardware store.

It was listed on the National Register of Historic Places in 2010.

References

Barns on the National Register of Historic Places in Missouri
Buildings and structures completed in 1912
Buildings and structures in Johnson County, Missouri
National Register of Historic Places in Johnson County, Missouri